Kiro Stojanov (born 9 April 1959 in the village of Radovo, Bosilovo Municipality) is the Roman Catholic Bishop of Skopje and the Eparchial Bishop of the Macedonian Catholic Eparchy of the Blessed Virgin Mary Assumed in Strumica-Skopje of the Macedonian Greek Catholic Church.

Biography 
In 2005, he succeeded Joakim Herbut as both Roman Catholic Bishop of Skopje and Apostolic exarch of Macedonia, becoming the head of the Macedonian Greek Catholic Church. On 31 May 2018, the apostolic exarchate was elevated to the rank of an eparchy (diocese) as the Macedonian Catholic Eparchy of the Blessed Virgin Mary Assumed in Strumica-Skopje, of which Stojanov became the first eparch.

Bibliography 
 Kiro Stojanov: Dialogue based on the foundations that connect us. A contribution toward strengthening relations among the churches and religious communities in Macedonia. In: Journal of Ecumenical Studies 39(2002), Nr. 1-2, S. 73-76.
 Neue Malteser in Makedonien aufgenommen. In: Malteser Kreuz 2003, Heft 3/4.

References 

1959 births
Living people
People from Bosilovo Municipality
20th-century Eastern Catholic bishops
21st-century Eastern Catholic bishops
21st-century Roman Catholic bishops in North Macedonia
Macedonian Eastern Catholics
Macedonian Greek Catholic Church
Bishops of Skopje
Macedonian Roman Catholic bishops